Tan Kun-giok (1905 – 4 March 1963), also known as Chen Chun-yu in Mandarin, was a Taiwanese songwriter and author born in Dadaocheng. He wrote many Hokkien songs such as Thiau Bu Si Tai (跳舞時代) and Siu Be Toa Kang Tiau (想要彈像調), and had served as an officer of the Columbia Record, a Japanese-owned disc company. Tan could speak Mandarin Chinese fluently, he was an introducer of Mandarin to postwar Taiwan. Chen died from hepatic cancer in 1963.

References

Taiwanese songwriters
1905 births
1963 deaths
Musicians from Taipei